André Dufau (8 August 1905 – 31 August 1990) was a French sprinter. He competed in the men's 100 metres at the 1928 Summer Olympics.

References

1905 births
1990 deaths
Athletes (track and field) at the 1928 Summer Olympics
French male sprinters
Olympic athletes of France
Sportspeople from Arras